The Cambodian National Sustaining Party was created by its president Pen Sovan. Formed on 21 January 1998, and holding its first party congress on the same day.

Political ideology
This political party's ideology is a combination of several ideas. One of its ideologies that's right-wing is supporting and promoting "Nation Religion and King", "constitutional monarchy" and to "protect the constitution of Cambodia". With the other part of its ideology which is left-wing is again promoting/supporting "women's rights in society" and promote equal rights for women like men in both "political" and "social" roles. Another left-wing idea is promoting peoples interests in the present and future. The other part of its ideology is liberalism since the CNSP believes in "peace", "freedom", opposition to "anarchism", "dictatorship" and prevent "starvation and poverty" in Cambodia, and construct a "free and pluralistic democracy".

Political activities
The CNSP's press secretary explained to a Cambodian newspaper called Phnom Pehn that the CNSP expresses an "appeal" for investigators from the "Human Rights Action Committee" to investigate the deaths of rival candidates like the one called Meas Soy of FUNCINPEC competing against Sam Rainsy and another called Uch Horn who was affected by political violence. This is because the Cambodian National Sustaining Party wanted to protect democracy and safety of political party candidates for a free and fair 2002 February election.

CNSP gallery

References

External links
Cambodian National Sustaining Party website

1998 establishments in Cambodia
Buddhist political parties
Buddhist democratic parties
Cambodian democracy movements
Liberal parties in Cambodia
Monarchist parties in Cambodia
Nationalist parties in Cambodia
Political parties established in 1998
Political parties in Cambodia